The 1951–52 Northern Football League season was the 54th in the history of the Northern Football League, a football competition in Northern England.

Clubs

The league featured 14 clubs which competed in the last season, no new clubs joined the league this season.

League table

Following this season
Durham City Joined 
Heaton Stannington Left

References

1951-52
4